Olex may refer to:

 Olex, Oregon, an unincorporated community in Gilliam County, Oregon, United States
 Olex2, software for crystallographic research
  (Aktiengesellschaft für österreichische und ungarische Mineralölprodukte), a former Austrian-Hungarian oil company

See also
 Olexandr